Aileen Convery (born 10 July 1969) is an Irish swimmer. She competed in two events, the 100m and 200m backstroke, at the 1988 Summer Olympics.  She finished 29th in the 100m event and 18th in the 200m event.

References

External links
 

1969 births
Living people
Irish female swimmers
Olympic swimmers of Ireland
Swimmers at the 1988 Summer Olympics
Place of birth missing (living people)